Myk Watford is an American actor and musician. He is best known for his roles in the 2008 film Trailer Park of Terror, Spider-Man and the 2019 film The Kitchen.

Early life and education 
Watford was born in St. Petersburg, FL and grew up in Russellville, AL which is 30 miles south of Muscle Shoals in North Alabama. He attended the University of Utah, where he was classically trained in theatre. Watford currently resides in Los Angeles, CA.

Career

Film and television 
In 2002, Watford was cast as a cop in Sam Raimi's Spider-Man, starring Tobey Maguire and Kirsten Dunst. He also appeared as Roach in Trailer Park of Terror (2008), No Country for Old Men (2007) and as Richard Matt in Lifetime's New York Prison Break The Seduction of Joyce Mitchell(2017) with Penelope Ann Miller. Watford's television credits include CSI, Law And Order: SVU, Criminal Minds, Without a Trace, NCIS, The Mentalist, Breaking Bad, Bones, Scandal, Longmire, Lethal Weapon, and Bosch. He can currently be seen as Detective Morelli in Season 3 of HBO’s True Detective and as Eichler in the Netflix series The OA.

In 2019, Watford appeared as Little Jackie in Andrea Berloff’s directorial debut, The Kitchen.

Theatre 
Watford has also appeared in the Broadway and Off-Broadway productions Take Me Out, Hank Williams: Lost Highway, The Good Negro and Five by Tenn.

Music 
Watford is also the front man of the popular swamp-rockabilly band, Stumpwaller, as well as the Johnny Cash Tribute Band, Big Cash and the Folsom 3.

Filmography

Further reading 

 Healy, Allie. (November 30, 2016). "Lifetime plans prison escape movie: Who will star in 'The Joyce Mitchell Story?" NYUp.com
 Chen, Ming. (June 5, 2019). "Myk Watford: The Kitchen." A Shared Universe Podcast Network.
 Greer, Ed. Swallow, Ron. (May 6, 2019). "Myk Watford GOATS Michael Myers." Nerd G.O.A.T. Podcast.
 Cusack, Ryan. (June 1, 2019). "A ctor Myk Watford Talks New Horror-Thriller ‘Portal’ And Much More!" iHorror.com.
 Cochran, Ariel. (July 25, 2019). "Alabama’s Myk Watford in “The Kitchen” with latest film." CBS42.com

References

External links 
Official Website

American male film actors
American male television actors
Living people
Year of birth missing (living people)